Manuel José Azevedo Vieira (born 4 February 1981), known as Manuel José, is a Portuguese professional footballer who plays for CD Candal. Mainly a right midfielder, he can also play as an attacking right-back.

Club career
Born in Vila Nova de Gaia, Porto District, Manuel José unsuccessfully graduated from FC Porto's academy, going on to serve a number of loans before being released in June 2005. He made his Primeira Liga debut with Académica de Coimbra, where he played from January to June 2003.

After a solid season with Porto's neighbours Boavista FC, Manuel José joined Romania's CFR Cluj Portuguese contingent in June 2006, for €300,000. In his first year in Liga I he was a regular and the team player with the most assists, accumulating eleven decisive passes; however, with the arrival of Ioan Andone as head coach in the summer of 2007, he lost his place in the starting XI and failed to regain that position.

On 5 February 2009, Manuel José terminated his contract with Cluj. He returned to Portugal in July, signing with F.C. Paços de Ferreira. He scored a career-best eight goals in the 2012–13 campaign – in only 19 starts – being essential as the club finished third and qualified for the UEFA Champions League for the first time in its history.

Honours
Porto
Taça de Portugal: 2002–03

Vitória Setúbal
Taça de Portugal: 2004–05

Cluj
Liga I: 2007–08
Cupa României: 2007–08, 2008–09

References

External links

1981 births
Living people
Sportspeople from Vila Nova de Gaia
Portuguese footballers
Association football midfielders
Primeira Liga players
Liga Portugal 2 players
Segunda Divisão players
FC Porto B players
FC Porto players
C.F. União de Lamas players
Associação Académica de Coimbra – O.A.F. players
Vitória S.C. players
Vitória F.C. players
Boavista F.C. players
F.C. Paços de Ferreira players
Leixões S.C. players
Gondomar S.C. players
CD Candal players
Liga I players
CFR Cluj players
Portugal youth international footballers
Portugal under-21 international footballers
Portugal B international footballers
Portuguese expatriate footballers
Expatriate footballers in Romania
Portuguese expatriate sportspeople in Romania